Savonranta is a former municipality of Finland. It became part of Savonlinna in early 2009.

It is located in the province of Eastern Finland and is part of the Southern Savonia region. The municipality had a population of 1,263 (2003) and covered an area of 568.59 km² of which 182.55 km² is water. The population density was 3.3 inhabitants per km².

The municipality was unilingually Finnish.

Kolovesi National Park, home of the Saimaa Ringed Seals – one of the most endangered seals in the world, 
is located in Savonranta and its neighbour municipalities Enonkoski and Heinävesi.

Notable residents
Aino Kuusinen (1886-1970) - Communist politician and wife of Otto Wille Kuusinen
Toivo Turtiainen (1883-1920) - Politician and Member of Parliament (1919-1920)

See also
Orivirran saarto

External links

 Satellite picture

Populated places disestablished in 2009
2009 disestablishments in Finland
Former municipalities of Finland
Savonlinna